Satyrium acaciae, the sloe hairstreak, is a butterfly in the family Lycaenidae.

Description from Seitz

T. acaciae F. (73b). Smaller than true ilicis, hardly so large as esculi. Above uniformly dark 
brown, the male bearing 1-3, the female 2-5 small red anal spots. The line of white bars on the underside is straighter, being somewhat curved outward at the anal angle of the hindwing without forming a W. Male without scent-spot. Particularly in Central Europe. From South France to Asia Minor and Transcaucasia ; also in Spain, if not confounded with esculi; very local and usually rare. — abdominalis Gerh., from the Black Sea  countries, is larger and has a grey instead of brown under surface with the white line broader and continuous, the forewing bearing 1-3 dark spots beneath before the hind angle. — gerhardi Stgr. (73 c) is still larger and the hindwing beneath bears blue and black spots with hardly noticeable red edges, instead of a red band. These spots are separated from the edge of the wing by a usually very distinct white marginal line. At Mardin and Aintab. — beccarii Verity, from Florence, is a very small, dwarfed, form; almost tailless, the white line of the underside nearly obsolete. — Larva pale yellowish green or grass-green, with black head, two yellowish subdorsal lines and, further laterad, small pale oblique spots; in May adult on blackthorn, especially small bushes which grow on sunny slopes: the larva can be obtained by beating. The butterflies have very definite haunts which are widely dispersed throughout the distribution area and often of very limited extent ; they occur particularly on rocky slopes, with blackthorn hedges and exposed to the full force of the sun, in June, showing a preference for resting on Umbellifers.

Biology
The larva feeds on Prunus spinosa and Prunus divaricata

References

Satyrium (butterfly)
Butterflies of Europe
Butterflies described in 1787
Taxa named by Johan Christian Fabricius